The Chevrolet Detroit Grand Prix presented by Lear Corporation was the lone doubleheader event of the 2018 IndyCar Series season, consisting of the 7th and 8th rounds of the championship. The event was held at the Raceway at Belle Isle in Detroit, Michigan. Scott Dixon won Race 1, and Ryan Hunter-Reay won the Sunday race.

This event also marked the final IndyCar Series broadcast for ABC, ending a half-century stint covering the series (and its predecessors), as in 2019, NBC Sports will be the series’ only broadcaster. This would ultimately mark the end of Scott Goodyear's commentary career after 17 seasons with ESPN.

Race 1 – Saturday, June 2

Results

Qualifying

Race

Notes:
 Points include 1 point for leading at least 1 lap during a race, an additional 2 points for leading the most race laps. For Detroit only, 1 bonus point was awarded to the fastest qualifier from both groups.

Championship standings after Race 1 

Drivers' Championship standings

Manufacturer standings

 Note: Only the top five positions are included.

Race 2 – Sunday, June 3

Results

Qualifying

Race

Notes:
 Points include 1 point for leading at least 1 lap during a race, an additional 2 points for leading the most race laps. For Detroit only, 1 bonus point was awarded to the fastest qualifier from both groups.

Championship standings after Race 2 

Drivers' Championship standings

Manufacturer standings

 Note: Only the top five positions are included.

References

Chevrolet Detroit Grand Prix
2018 Chevrolet Detroit Grand Prix
Detroit Indy Grand Prix
Chevrolet Detroit Grand Prix
2018 in Detroit